Las Toscas may refer to:

Las Toscas, Canelones a town of Canelones Department, Uruguay
Las Toscas, Tacuarembó a town of Tacuarembó Department, Uruguay